Araruna is a municipality in the state of Paraíba in the Northeast Region of Brazil.

The municipality contains the  Pedra da Boca State Park, created in 2000 to protect an unusual set of rocky outcrops.

See also
List of municipalities in Paraíba

References

Municipalities in Paraíba